Dyadobacter tibetensis  is a Gram-negative, aerobic, rod-shaped and non-motile  bacterium from the genus of Dyadobacter which has been isolated from a glacial ice core from the Tibetan Plateau in China.

References

External links
Type strain of Dyadobacter tibetensis at BacDive -  the Bacterial Diversity Metadatabase

Cytophagia
Bacteria described in 2013